America-Pacific Luge Championship is annual luge competition held by International Luge Federation since 2012. There are men's and women's single events and a double event.

Host cities
2012: Calgary, Canada
2013: Lake Placid, United States
2014: Lake Placid, United States
2015: Calgary, Canada
2016: Park City, United States
2019: Whistler, British Columbia, Canada
2021: Sochi, Russia

Men's singles

Women's singles

Doubles

Medal table

References
2012 America-Pacific Luge Championship results
2013 America-Pacific Luge Championship results
2014 America-Pacific Luge Championship results
2015 America-Pacific Luge Championship results
2016 America-Pacific Luge Championship results

Luge competitions